Hypoecta longula is a species of ulidiid or picture-winged fly in the genus Hypoecta of the family Ulidiidae.

References

Ulidiidae